Mario LeBlanc (born 1977) better known under his stage name Fayo (transl. bean), is an Acadian musician born in Dieppe, New Brunswick. As many artists from south eastern New Brunswick, Fayo sings in chiac, the local French dialect mixing French words with English grammar, and vice versa. His music is a blend of folk, rock and urban poetry.

Biography
Fayo started writing songs at the age of thirteen. He then sang for the Acadian band Réveil until 1996. In 1999, he wrote an Acadian poetry book entitled Taches de naissance (transl. Birthmarks).

Soon after, he would start his solo career. In 2000, he won the singer-songwriter of the year award at the Gala de la Chanson de Caraquet (fr) for his album La fiève des fèves (transl. Bean Fever). He then goes on tour with two of his friends, Rémi Arsenault (contrabass) and Steven LeBlanc (guitar). Also in 2000, he won the Prix Éloizes (fr) as "Newcomer of the Year" (Découverte de l'Année).

In 2006, Fayo would record his second album Accent Aigu (transl. Acute Accent).

Fayo worked with Bosnian singer Lepa Brena on her 2011 album, Začarani krug. He composed the music for the song "Briši me" with Hajrudin Hari Varešanović.

Discography

Poetry

References

External links
Fayo official website 

Acadian culture in New Brunswick
1977 births
Living people
People from Dieppe, New Brunswick
Musicians from New Brunswick